The women's tournament in ice hockey at the 2002 Winter Olympics was held in Provo and West Valley City, United States, from 11 to 21 February. Eight teams competed, seeded into two groups. Canada won the final by a score of 3–2 over the United States, who were awarded silver. The bronze medal game was won by Sweden with a 2–1 victory over Finland.

The tournament consisted of 20 games: 12 in the preliminary round (teams play the other teams in their own group); 4 final classification games; 2 semifinal games; 1 bronze medal game; and 1 final.

Qualifying

The qualification process, and seedings for the Olympic tournament, came from the final standings of the 2000 IIHF Women's World Championship.  The top six nations were given direct entry to the Olympics, the final two spots were contested in a qualification tournament.  The nations ranked seven through ten played a round robin in Engelberg, Switzerland from 8 to 11 February 2001.

All times are local (UTC+1).

Rosters

Group A
 (roster)
 (roster)
 (roster)
 (roster)

Group B
 (roster)
 (roster)
 (roster)
 (roster)

Preliminary round
All times are local (UTC–7).

Group A

Group B

Classification round

5–8th place semifinals

Seventh place game

Fifth place game

Final round

Semifinals

Bronze medal game

Gold medal game

Final rankings

Statistics

Scoring leaders
List shows the top ten skaters sorted by points, then goals.

GP = Games played; G = Goals; A = Assists; Pts = Points; +/− = Plus-minus; PIM = Penalties in minutes; POS = Position
Source: IIHF.com

Leading goaltenders
Only the top five goaltenders, based on save percentage, who have played at least 40% of their team's minutes, are included in this list.

TOI = Time on ice (minutes:seconds); GA = Goals against;  GAA = Goals against average; SA = Shots against; Sv% = Save percentage; SO = Shutouts

Awards
Media All-Stars
Goaltender:  Kim St-Pierre
Defencemen:  Tara Mounsey,  Angela Ruggiero
Forwards:  Natalie Darwitz,  Cammi Granato,  Hayley Wickenheiser
Most Valuable Player:  Hayley Wickenheiser
Best players selected by the directorate:
Best Goaltender:  Kim St-Pierre
Best Defenceman:  Angela Ruggiero
Best Forward:  Hayley Wickenheiser

References

External links
Official results for women's tournament 
Salt Lake City 2002 – Results – Ice hockey – Women

Ice hockey at the 2002 Winter Olympics
2001–02 in American women's ice hockey
2002
Olympics
Women's ice hockey competitions in the United States
Women's events at the 2002 Winter Olympics
Women's sports in Utah